Janid Ortiz, known as Janid, is a Puerto Rican singer, songwriter, actress and reality TV star. Musically, she lies between Latin Pop, Contemporary R&B, and Electronica genres. Born in New York City and raised in Puerto Rico, she first began to gain recognition in 2014 when she released her Spanish album "La Magia" under the Sony Music Latin imprint label, Handshake.

In the summer of 2015 she rose to fame when she released the single "Penicilina" under the independent label Kalvo Music, featuring versions in Contemporary R&B produced by Kaydean, a Reggaeton remix by DJ Nelson featuring J Alvarez, a Bachata version featuring Optimo, and a Salsa version produced by Angel "Cucco" Peña featuring NG2. "Penicilina" peaked at No. 25 on the Tropical Billboard Chart, No. 6 in Puerto Rico and No. 2 in Dominican Republic.

The popularity gained from "Penicilina" earned Janid her own reality show on Mega TV, Janid: Atrediva. The first episode aired on September 6, 2015.

Early life
Janid was born into a musical family. From an early age she went on to take ballet, singing and piano lessons. She then joined her school choir and later moved to South Carolina where she joined a Gospel choir. She appeared on many jingles, radio station IDs and TV commercials before she started focusing on a career as a solo artist.  She has cited Tina Turner, Donna Summer, Aretha Franklin,  Grace Jones, La Lupe, Sia, Draco Rosa and Ednita Nazario as her musical influences

Career 

Janid moved back to New York City in 2005 where she spent many years in Queens developing her style. During her time in New York she released a handful of independent albums that failed to achieve commercial success. She performed at several venues from dive bars to Webster Hall and she performed twice at the Puerto Rican Day Parade.

Janid has collaborated with many renowned artists including Frankie Cutlass, Michael Stuart and DJ Baron Lopez. She also performed in Arthur Hanlon's Encanto del Caribe TV special alongside Marc Anthony, Laura Pausini, Natalia Jiménez, Cheo Feliciano and Bernie Williams.

Discography

Goddess (2006)
ONE (2007)
Twisted (2009)
Alias (2010)
Más Allá de Andrómeda (2012)
La Magia (2014)
Penicilina EP Written by Rey Severo & Gran Omar (2015)

Filmography

See also 

List of Puerto Ricans
Puerto Rican songwriters

References

External links
 Official Website

Living people
Year of birth missing (living people)
21st-century American actresses
Actresses from New York City
American actresses of Puerto Rican descent
American women pop singers
American women singer-songwriters
American mezzo-sopranos
American Latin pop singers
American musicians of Puerto Rican descent
American voice actresses
Singers from New York City
Spanish-language singers of the United States
Hispanic and Latino American musicians
Latin pop singers
21st-century Puerto Rican women singers
Puerto Rican female models
Singer-songwriters from New York (state)